John Buchanan (1772–November 6, 1844) was a Maryland politician and long-serving Justice of the Maryland Court of Appeals, sitting on the court from 1806 to 1844, and serving as chief justice from 1824 to 1844.

Biography
John Buchanan was born in 1772, in Prince George's County, Maryland to Thomas Buchanan and Mary Cook or Anne Cooke Buchanan. He attended Charlotte Hall School in St. Mary's County, Maryland. He read law under Judge Robert White in Winchester, Virginia and John Thomson Mason in Hagerstown, Maryland.

Buchanan served in the Maryland House of Delegates for Washington County, Maryland from 1797 to 1799. In 1806, he began 38 years of simultaneous service as both Chief Judge of the Washington County Circuit Court, 5th Judicial Circuit, and justice of the Maryland Court of Appeals. On the latter court, he was an associate justice from 1806 to 1824, and Chief Judge from 1824 until his death in 1844. He was also a Presidential Elector in 1817, and director of the Hagerstown Bank from 1820 to 1825.

He married Sophia Williams, with whom he has one son, Thomas Eli Buchanan. He resided at an estate named "Woodland", near Williamsport, Maryland, and died there on November 6, 1844.

References

Judges of the Maryland Court of Appeals
1772 births
1844 deaths
Members of the Maryland House of Delegates
Charlotte Hall Military Academy alumni
U.S. state supreme court judges admitted to the practice of law by reading law